Malu is a commune located in Giurgiu County, Muntenia, Romania. It is composed of a single village, Malu, part of Vedea Commune until it was split off in 2003.

References

Communes in Giurgiu County
Localities in Muntenia
Populated places on the Danube